This list of governors of Kongo Central includes governors of the Kongo Central Province, Democratic Republic of the Congo, in the period from when it was formed on 14 August 1962 from part of Léopoldville Province to the present. It has taken the names Congo Central from 14 August 1962, Bas-Zaïre from 27 October 1971, Bas-Congo in 1997 and its current name of Kongo Central in 2015.

Congo Central (1962–1972)

The governors (or equivalent) of Congo Central were:

Bas-Zaïre (1972–1997)

The governors (or equivalent) of Bas-Zaïre were:

Bas-Congo (1997–2015)

The governors (or equivalent) of Bas-Congo were:

Kongo Central (2015 – present)

The governors (or equivalent) of Kongo Central were:

See also
Lists of provincial governors of the Democratic Republic of the Congo

References

Kongo Central
Governors of provinces of the Democratic Republic of the Congo